The slogan “Sa ikauunlad ng bayan, disiplina ang kailangan" (Filipino for "For the nation’s progress, discipline is needed") was a political catchphrase created by the administration of Philippine President Ferdinand Marcos after his declaration of martial law, as a justification for his authoritarian rule and in an effort to promote the "new society". Continuing the racist trend of government propaganda from the Philippines' Spanish and US colonial periods to portray Filipinos as children unable to govern themselves, the slogan was used to justify the "disciplining" of Philippine society by a “benevolent strongman” who knows what is best and who could therefore "lead the country through a period of chaos".

But Ariel Ureta, one of the TV personalities during Martial Law mocked the slogan into "Sa ikauunlad ng bayan, bisikleta ang kailangan" (Filipino for "For the nation's progress, bicycle is needed"). But after that mocking, he was allegedly caught by then-Philippine Constabulary and sent him to Camp Crame to ride a bike to the whole PC headquarters that he later denied.

See also
Kilusang Bagong Lipunan
Marcos propaganda

References 

Ferdinand Marcos
Philippine political catchphrases
Presidency of Ferdinand Marcos